Putrajaya Ring Road or Jalan Lingkaran Bandar, Federal Route 30, is a major highway in Putrajaya, Malaysia. It connects Persiaran Selatan interchange in the west to Persiaran Timur interchange in the north.

Some sections have motorcycle lanes.

Lists of interchanges

References

Highways in Malaysia
Highways in Putrajaya
Malaysian Federal Roads